Sachs Bikes International Company Limited (SFM GmbH) is a German-based motorcycle manufacturer, founded in 1886 in Schweinfurt as Schweinfurter Präzisions-Kugellagerwerke Fichtel & Sachs, formerly known as Fichtel & Sachs, Mannesmann Sachs and later just Sachs.

It is one of the world's oldest motorcycle manufacturers, and manufactured their first motorcycle in 1904. Peugeot, the oldest extant, began manufacture in 1898. Indian Motorcycle began producing bikes in 1901.Triumph produced bikes in 1902 and Harley-Davidson and Husqvarna both in 1903. The company produced ball bearings, motorcycle engines and bicycle parts. Sachs Motorcycles was a subsidiary producing motorcycles, mopeds, motorised bicycles and all-terrain vehicles (ATVs). The manufacturing of motorcycles was broken out of Sachs into its own company and the parent company producing automotive parts was bought by ZF Friedrichshafen AG to form ZF Sachs.

History
The company was established in Neumarkt by Carl Marschütz on April 5, 1886, as "Nuremberg Hercules-Werke". Initially, it manufactured bicycles and had eight employed, then increasing to 170 eight years later. By 1984 the company produced almost 5,000 bicycles. One year later, facilities were moved from Neumarkt to the Fürther Straße in Nuremberg.

Hercules developed an electronic vehicle in 1898, with a maximum speed of 40 km/h, before manufacturing its first motorcycle in 1905. By then the company also produced light trucks with a capacity of 1,2 tn. In 1930 the company started production of three-wheeled automobiles with 200 cc-engines.
 	
Sachs took over Victoria, Express and DKW in the 1960s. Fichtel & Sachs became a large maker of automotive parts. Their moped motors continued to be used by many brands until the mid-90s and small capacity motorcycle engines of up to 175 cc displacement were also made. The company began to supply motorcycles for the German Federal Armed Forces in 1992.

After facing a series of financial problems, stemming from pensions issues relating to the Hercules bicycle works, the company went into insolvency proceedings and ultimately saw a successful management buyout led by the managing director Corrado Savazzi. At this time Sachs was reduced to local assembly of small, cheap, Chinese-sourced scooters, which weren't doing well. The distinctive Sachs MadAss was the only Sachs-engineered motorcycle made at the time.

The insolvency administrator Mr. Wolker Boehm was not only able to continue trading, but also put the company in a position to develop new models, such as the new XTC125, unveiled at the Intermot fair in Cologne, Germany in October 2006. In 2007 the company moved to new locations in Nuremberg (Katzwang) and 2008 changed its name from SACHS Fahrzeug- und Motorentechnik GmbH to SFM GmbH. In 2010 it has become one of the market leaders in self-propelled electric bicycles and development of new motorcycle and scooter models has continued, taking the brand away from local assembly of cheap scooters under the crisis years to possibly rebuilding its own former strong identity.

Models

 150KN (Sold in Australia as "Express")
 B-805
 Balboa
 Bee 50 and Bee 125
 Big Roadster V 3.8
 City 125
 City 150
 Dirty Devil 50
 Dirty Devil 110
 MadAss
 Prima
 Prima G3
 Roadster 650
 Hercules 125 cc
 Sachs Roadster 800
 Roadster V 1.6
 Roadster 125 V2
 Roadster 2000
 Speedjet R 50 (Air cooled)
 Speedjet RS 50 (Liquid cooled intr. 2010)
 SR 125
 SX-1
 SX-1 (Urbano Limited Edition)
 VS 125
 Westlake
 X Road
 XTC 125
 XTC-N
 XTC-R
 ZZ 125
 ZX 125 
 Speedster 250cc (America Latina)
 Rsv 180cc (America Latina)

References

External links

 

 
Motorcycle engine manufacturers
Motorcycle manufacturers of Germany
Manufacturing companies based in Nuremberg
Vehicle manufacturing companies established in 1886
1886 establishments in Germany
German brands